Daniel Cavanagh  was  Bishop of Leighlin  from 1567 to 1589.

References

16th-century Anglican bishops in Ireland
Bishops of Leighlin